Criminal Audition is a 2019 British thriller horror film written by Luke Kaile and Samuel Gridley, and directed by Gridley in his feature film debut. The film stars Kaile, Rich Keeble, Rebecca Calienda and Noeleen Comiskey.

The film had its world premiere at the London FrightFest Film Festival on 24 August 2019.

Synopsis 
An ex-lawyer, William (Rich Keeble) and his team consisting of Ryan (Luke Kaile), Moe (Scott Samain) and Adeline (Angela Peters), run an underworld service providing fake criminals to take on other people's crimes. But a new dangerous client, Ms M (Noeleen Comiskey) turns their world upside down as they face lies, deceit and murder over the course of one night.

Plot 
An underground organization which helps free paying criminals helps out yet another client; Miss M. William, Adeline, Moe, and Ryan are founders of this organization, Ryan being an expert as he was used in a trial before joining. At the beginning of the film, we see that members of this underground organization have put together a total of 3 potential candidates (supposed to be 4 but one is missing) for the murder case they are covering. Each candidate is blinded by sacks and bound in handcuffs linked to one another in a chain. They are to undergo a series of tests to figure out which of the 3 fits the profile and will be convicted for this case.

The client in question, Miss M, appears with her assistant Morris to shake things up and to make sure that her money is being well spent to cover her tracks. After interfering with several of the procedures the organization has, Miss M, ends up killing P after he refused to bash someone’s head in like she asked. Ryan who is becoming fed up with the interference and brutality of the client tries to free another candidate. Morris sees this and promptly drugs and strangles the candidate before they have a chance to fight back.

It’s down to two candidates now, L and J. Miss M test them on how to hide the body and despite the impressive answer J gave, L is declared the winner based on Ryan’s reaction. Miss M changes the game after this “victory” for L. She decides to choose Ryan as a candidate based on a deal William had made prior to a threat she made against him. Ryan— who wants out of this deal, is baffled and tries to convince the duo otherwise but is knocked out.

The true motive behind Miss M and Morris’ involvement is based on the case Ryan had confessed to before joining the team. The victim of the said case had been her sister and a dear friend of Morris, they were unhappy to find out that justice had actually not been served and are looking for revenge. Their plan to torture and kill all members of the team had been short-lived as Ryan was able to slit the throat of Morris before he was able to torture him. L and Ryan find and shoot Miss M after she doused William and Adeline in gas. William tries to persuade Ryan to free him and to take the money, but Ryan and L leave the pair tied up. The film ends with L and Ryan escaping with the money, an unspoken bond between the two now.

Cast 

 Luke Kaile as Ryan
 Rich Keeble as William
 Rebecca Calienda as L
 Noeleen Comiskey as Ms M
 Cameron Harris as Morris
 Scott Samain as Moe
 Blain Neale as J
 Ben Scheck as P
 Jonathan Burteaux as Benoit
 Angela Peters as Adeline

Production

Development 
The film originally started as a play written by Kaile in 2009 after he finished college. He entered many film writing competitions for practice and continued to write—even if they were terrible! Criminal Audition was the script that was to be adapted to the stage and once Kaile saw the potential in it, he decided to expand it into a film. He spoke with members of the audience and saw their enthusiasm, realizing that this story is one that could be rooted in the real world as well. That was enough for Kaile and soon brought the play to Gridley to develop it into the final screenplay over the following years.

Soon after, Muzzle the Pig and Blood & Tweed joined forces with British production company Mordue Pictures to help finally bring the film to fruition.

Principal photography began in October 2017 and took place at the Network Theatre in Waterloo, London, over a period of 15 days.

The official trailer was released on 5 July 2019.

Casting 
The cast was found in a traditional manner, going out to find actors and holding auditions to see who would fit the role best. Kaile who is an actor himself is already in the network and was able to find potential stars through social media sites such as Twitter and Instagram. Seeing as they did casting calls and auditions many years ago before the movie was set to be filmed, a lot of the cast were still on board by the time Criminal Audition was actually made.

Kaile and Gridley were relieved to find that despite the premature casting, they still had actors willing to work with them. They both agree that in future films, they’ll plan the order of things a bit more carefully in case they aren’t as lucky to meet such a flexible cast again.

Filming 
Originally, Criminal Audition was supposed to be filmed in 2013 and 2014; however, the filming process did not truly begin until 2017. The filming took place in London in one building over the course of the movie. It was shot in tinted freeze frames in the beginning of the production. The use of VCRs and cassette players also made the setting of the eighties and early nineties come to life. On top of that, the filming of this movie is made to be continuous, almost as if the action never stops over the course of a night, as the intensity grows.

Kaile, in an interview, talked about how responsibilities of filming were equally cast. This led to him hiring two producers, Nathaniel Francis and Luke Mordue, who were major tributes to the making of this movie. Another trademark of Criminal Audition that Kaile touches on is the claustrophobic vibe that can be felt through the screen, which is also apart of why it was decided to be filmed in such a limited setting.

The building Criminal Audition was filmed in is called the Networth Theater underneath the station of Waterloo. This was perfect for the team since they were looking for an actual theater to shoot in. Another important point to the crew’s process was the mistakes made in the past that added to the learning process of making this movie in the best possible way. In this interview, Kaile briefly talked about how before, casting was done too early and this is what gave the creators patience in such a high-paced environment. This was essential to the nine year journey to the release of Criminal Audition.

Music 

The soundtrack for the film was composed by Al Anderson and Asa Bennett, who usually collaborate under the name Bůte.
The music makes extensive use of sampled sounds (a feature of Bůte‘s music where no traditional instruments or synths are used) but also uses real instruments, notably the use of Baritone guitar and whistling which is reminiscent of Ennio Moriconne’s scores.

The soundtrack was released in October 2020 to coincide with the release of the film.

Reception 
Sight & Sound featured the film as one of their "10 Human Horror Highlights" while Entertainment Focus included it in its "10 hidden gems you need to see" list.

In a 4/5 review, Luke Ryan Baldock of The Hollywood News praised the script and the acting, calling the film "a genuinely well-crafted feature that utilises its limitations." In his 3.5/5 review for Entertainment Focus, Pip Ellwood-Hughes stated "while not a perfect film, Criminal Audition is a strong statement of intent from two exciting new faces on the horror circuit."

Release 
Criminal Audition was released on Blu-Ray and VOD in the United States and Canada through Gravitas Ventures on October 13, 2020. It was released in the UK digitally, through 101 Films on iTunes, Amazon and Sky Store on October 26, 2020.
Criminal Audition made its UK premiere at the Prince Charles Cinema in 2019. Luke Kaile and Samuel Gridley made an appearance at this event along with a few producers from their supporting companies. Mordue Productions, Muzzle the Pig, and Blood & Tweed representatives were also there to see the success of the film they backed. Kaile and Gridley presented their film and gave the audience a little behind the scenes exclusive look into how the film was brought about.

References

External links 
 
Criminal Audition on www.morduepictures.com

2019 horror thriller films
2019 films
British horror thriller films
Films shot in London
2010s English-language films
2010s British films